Skwala is a genus of springflies in the family Perlodidae. There are about five described species in Skwala.

Species
 Skwala americana (Klapálek, 1912) (American springfly)
 Skwala asiatica Zhiltzova, 1972
 Skwala compacta (McLachlan, 1872)
 Skwala curvata (Hanson, 1942) (curved springfly)
 Skwala natorii Chino, 1999

References

Further reading

 
 
 
 
 

Perlodidae